The Balad al-Shaykh massacre was the killing of a large number of Arab villagers by the Haganah in the  Palestinian Arab village of Balad al-Shaykh during the early stages of the 1947–1948 civil war in Mandatory Palestine. It was one of the largest, and earliest, massacres during the 1948 Palestine war.

The massacre took place in the early morning – some of the men, women and children were killed in their beds. The killings had a significant effect on morale amongst Palestinian civilians in the Haifa region.

Background
The incident was part of the 1947–1948 civil war between Jews and Arabs in Mandatory Palestine. It was preceded by a number of violent incidents, perpetrated one in retaliation for the other.  The first major reprisal against the village of Balad al-Shaykh took place on the 12 December, following sporadic Arab firing at traffic through Wadi Rushmiya. Haganah forces killed 6 villagers.

The Haifa Oil Refinery massacre took place on 30 December 1947, the day before the second Balad al-Shaykh attack. In this case, it was the Zionist paramilitary group, the Irgun, which threw a number of grenades at a crowd of some 100 Arab day laborers who had gathered outside the main gate of the British-owned Haifa oil refinery looking for work, resulting in 6 deaths and 42 wounded. Arab refinery workers and others attacked Jewish workers, killing 39 of them.<ref name=Morris406>Benny Morris, 1948: A History of the First Arab-Israeli War, Yale University Press, p.406.</ref>

The conclusion of a committee of inquiry established by the Jewish community of Haifa was that the Arab attack was unpremeditated, being a response to the Irgun assault. The Jewish Agency condemned the same group for what it called an 'act of madness' that was responsible for the catastrophic loss of Jewish lives. At the same time, it authorized the Haganah to undertake an operation of retaliation.

Incident
On the night of December 31, 1947, to January 1, 1948, the Palmach, an arm of the Haganah, attacked the town of Balad al-Shaykh while the residents were asleep, firing from the slopes of Mount Carmel.

Israeli historian Benny Morris writes:

According to Zachary Lockman, about 60 men, women and children were killed and several dozen houses were blown up.

Legacy
The land of the former village is today part of the Israeli town of Nesher.

See also
 Killings and massacres during the 1948 Palestine War

References

Bibliography

 
 Morris, Benny (2003). The Birth of the Palestinian Refugee Problem Revisited. Cambridge: Cambridge University Press. 
 
 'The British Withdrawal From Palestine: Possible Advance Of Date By Six Weeks, 17 Killed In Attack On Arab Village', The Times'', Friday, January 2, 1948; pg. 4; Issue 50958; col A.

External links
 Haifa Refinery Riots from MidEastWeb

1947 in Mandatory Palestine
1948 in Mandatory Palestine
Mass murder in 1947
Mass murder in 1948
December 1947 events in Asia
January 1948 events in Asia
History of Mandatory Palestine
Massacres in Mandatory Palestine
Massacres of men
1948 massacres of Palestinians